The Deepest Cut Vol 1 is the first full-length album by Robert Haigh recorded under his Omni Trio moniker, released in 1995 through the Moving Shadow label. The album was released in the United States under the title Music For The New Millennium with different artwork the same year. The Japanese Avex Trax edition of the album, titled The Deepest Cut, also included unique artwork as well as a bonus 3" CD with 4 extra tracks not included on the UK or US releases.

In 1998, Moving Shadow reissued the album on CD format with a slightly different track listing that includes the bonus track "Torn".

Track listing

Release history

References

External links
 

1995 debut albums
Rob Haigh albums